Mario Sequi (1913-1992) was an Italian film director and screenwriter. A Sardinian by birth, he was married to the actress Lia Franca. He began his career in the 1930s as a production manager in the 1930s before becoming a director after the Second World War.

Selected filmography

Production manager
 I Met You Too Late (1940)
 Il vetturale del San Gottardo (1941)
 C'è un fantasma nel castello (1942)
 Orizzonte di sangue (1942)
 The White Angel (1943)

Assistant director
 O sole mio (1946)
 Peddlin' in Society (1946)

Director
 L'isola di Montecristo (1948)
 Altura (1949)
 Tragic Spell (1951)
 Gli uomini dal passo pesante (1965)
 The Cobra (1967)
 The Tigers of Mompracem (1970)
 The Silkworm (1973)

References

Bibliography 
 Bayman, Louis. The Operatic and the Everyday in Postwar Italian Film Melodrama. Edinburgh University Press, 2014.

External links 
 

1913 births
1992 deaths
20th-century Italian screenwriters
Italian film directors
People from Cagliari